Chordeumatida (from the Greek word for "sausage") is a large order of millipedes containing some 1200 species with a nearly worldwide distribution. Also known as sausage millipedes, they grow and develop through a series of moults, adding segments until they reach a fixed number in the adult stage, which is usually the same for a given sex in a given species, at which point the moulting and the addition of segments and legs stop. This mode of development, known as teloanamorphosis, distinguishes this order from most other orders of millipedes, which usually continue to moult as adults, developing through either euanamorphosis or hemianamorphosis.

Description
Chordeumatidans are relatively short-bodied, with only 26 to 32 body segments (including the telson) behind the head. A key feature is the presence of 6 large bristles (setae) on the dorsal surface of each body segment. The first segment (collum) is relatively narrow, giving the appearance of a distinct "neck" in many species. The body tapers towards the rear, and the rearmost tip (telson) contains silk-producing organs (spinnerets). A dorsal groove runs down the length of the body, and some species possess paranota, lateral extensions of the exoskeleton. Paranota are also found in some other millipedes, notably Polydesmida, from which Chordeumatidans can be distinguished by having a dorsal groove. Unlike most other helminthomorph (worm-like) millipedes, chordeumatidans lack ozopores.

Most chordeumatidan species have 30 body segments (including the telson) as adults, and adult females in these species have 50 leg pairs. In adult males in this order, two leg pairs (pair 8 and pair 9) are modified into gonopods, leaving 48 pair of walking legs in the typical adult male chordeumatidan. Many species in this order, however, deviate from this typical body plan.

Many chordeumatidan species deviate from the usual 30 segments: A few species have 26 segments as adults (e.g., Chamaesoma broelemanni and Opisthocheiron canayerensis), many species have 28 (e.g., Lipseuma josianae), one genus features 29 (Tianella, in which all but two species have 29), one species (Metamastigophorophyllon martensi) features 31, and many species have 32 (e.g., Altajosoma kemerovo). Some species also deviate by featuring sexual dimorphism in segment number, specifically, adult males with two segments fewer than adult females, for example, in the family Buotidae (males with 26, females with 28), in Xystrosoma beatense (males with 28, females with the usual 30), and in the family Peterjohnsiidae (males with the usual 30, females with 32).

With these deviations from the usual 30 segments, the number of leg pairs in adults changes, usually with two leg pairs added or subtracted for each segment added to or subtracted from the typical number. For example, in Chamaesoma broelemanni, with only 26 segments (four fewer than the typical number), adult females have only 42 leg pairs, and adult males have only 40 pairs of walking legs (excluding two pairs of gonopods). Adult females with 32 segments (two more than the typical number) have 54 leg pairs (e.g., in the family Peterjohnsiidae), which is the maximum number fixed by species in the class Diplopoda.

Many species deviate from the expected number of walking legs, however, because they deviate in terms of sex-linked modifications to their legs. For example, many species involve another leg pair in addition to pairs 8 and 9 in the gonopod complex in adult males. In the family Speophilosomatidae, leg pair 7 in adult males is modified as part of the gonopod complex. In many species, the gonopod complex instead includes leg pair 10 in addition to pairs 8 and 9 (e.g., Branneria carinata, Reginaterreuma monroei, Golovatchia magda, and  Hoffmaneuma exiguum). The family Chordeumatidae exhibits the most extensive modifications, including five leg pairs (pairs 7 through 11) in the gonopod complex. Some species also deviate from the usual body plan by reducing or eliminating leg pairs in the adult female. In the family Chordeumatidae, for example, adult females feature a legless sternite (the "platosternite") where a third pair of legs would otherwise be. In other species (e.g., the genus Kashmireuma and the species Vieteuma longi), adult females instead exhibit modifications to their second leg pair, which are reduced to small nubbins.

Distribution
Chordeumatidans have a large distribution, occurring on all continents except Antarctica. They are present in Madagascar but absent from sub-Saharan Africa and, aside from southern Chile, are largely absent from South America. They occur in the tropics of Central America, Southeast Asia, and Oceania, and as far south as Tasmania, New Zealand, and Chiloé Island, Chile. They are abundant in cold, rocky, mountainous areas of Europe and central Asia, and range northward to Scandinavia, Siberia, and in North America up into Canada and southwest Alaska.

Classification
Chordeumatida contains approximately 1200 species, classified in four suborders and approximately 50 families, although several families contain only one to five genera.

Suborder Chordeumatidea Pocock 1894 
Superfamily Chordeumatoidea  C. L. Koch, 1847 
Chordeumatidae C. L. Koch, 1847 
Speophilosomatidae  Takakuwa, 1949
Suborder Craspedosomatidea  Cook, 1895
Superfamily Anthroleucosomatoidea  Verhoeff 1899 
Anthroleucosomatidae  Verhoeff 1899 
Haasiidae  Hoffman, 1980 
Origmatogonidae  Verhoeff 1914
Vandeleumatidae  Mauriès, 1970 
Superfamily Brannerioidea Cook, 1896
Brachychaeteumatidae  Verhoeff, 1910
Branneriidae  Cook, 1896
Chaemosomatidae  Verhoeff, 1913
Golovatchiidae  Shear, 1992
Heterolatzeliidae  Verhoeff 1899
Kashmireumatidae  Mauriès, 1982
Macrochaeteumatidae  Verhoeff, 1914
Microlympiidae  Shear & Leonard, 2003
Niponiosomatidae  Verhoeff, 1941
Tingupidae  Loomis, 1966 
Trachygonidae  Cook, 1896
Superfamily Cleidogonoidea Cook, 1896
Biokoviellidae  Mrsic, 1992
Cleidogonidae  Cook, 1896
Entomobielziidae  Verhoeff, 1899
Lusitaniosomatidae  Schubart, 1953
Opisthocheiridae  Ribaut, 1913
Trichopetalidae  Verhoeff, 1914
Superfamily Craspedosomatoidea Gray in Jones, 1843  
Attemsiidae  Verhoeff, 1899    
Craspedosomatidae  Gray in Jones, 1843
Haplobainosomatidae  Verhoeff, 1909
Superfamily Haaseoidea Attems, 1899
Haaseidae  Attems, 1899
Superfamily Neoatractosomatoidea Verhoeff, 1901
Altajellidae  Mikhaljova & Golovatch, 2001
Cyrnosomatidae  Mauriès, 2003
Faginidae  Attems, 1926
Hoffmaneumatidae  Golovatch, 1978
Mastigophorophyllidae  Verhoeff, 1899
Neoactractosomatidae  Verhoeff, 1901
Superfamily Verhoeffioidea Verhoeff, 1899
Verhoeffiidae  Verhoeff, 1899
Suborder Heterochordeumatidea Shear, 2000
Superfamily Conotyloidea Cook, 1896
Adritylidae  Shear, 1971
Conotylidae  Cook, 1896
Superfamily Diplomaragnoidea Attems, 1907      
Diplomaragnidae  Attems, 1907
Superfamily Heterochordeumatoidea Pocock, 1894
Eudigonidae  Verhoeff, 1914
Heterochordeumatidae  Pocock, 1894
Megalotylidae  Golovatch, 1978
Metopidiotrichidae Attems, 1907
Peterjohnsiidae  Mauriès, 1987
Superfamily Pygmaeosomatoidea Carl, 1941
Lankasomatidae  Mauriès 1978
Pygmaeosomatidae  Carl, 1941
Suborder Striariidea Cook, 1896
Superfamily Caseyoidea Verhoeff, 1909
Caseyidae  Verhoeff, 1909
Urochordeumatidae  Silvestri, 1909
Superfamily Striarioidea Bollman, 1893
Apterouridae  Loomis, 1966
Buotidae  Shear, 2009
Rhiscosomididae  Silvestri, 1909
Striariidae  Bollman, 1893

References

External links

Chordeumatida of Tasmania
North American Chordeumatida on BugGuide.net

 
Millipede orders